The TA-125 Index, typically referred to as the Tel Aviv 125 and formerly the TA-100 Index, is a stock market index of the 125 most highly capitalised companies listed on the Tel Aviv Stock Exchange (TASE). The index began on 1 January 1992 with a base level of 100. The highest value reached to date is 1247.92, in January 2011. On 12 February 2017, the index was expanded to include 125 instead of 100 stocks, in an attempt to improve stability and therefore reduce risk for trackers and encourage foreign investment.

Overview
The index is maintained by the Tel Aviv Stock Exchange and is calculated in real-time during trading hours and published every 30 seconds. The index combines the companies that are listed in the TA-35 and TA-90 indices.

TA-35 Index

The TA-35 Index is the TASE's flagship index. It was first published in 1992 under the name "MA'OF Index". The TA-35 index tracks the prices of the shares of the 35 companies with the highest market capitalization on the exchange. It serves as an underlying asset for options and futures, Index-Linked Certificates and Reverse Certificates traded on the exchange and worldwide. The index also began on 1 January 1992 with a base level of 100, and expanded from 25 to 35 stocks together with the TA-125 in February 2017.

TA-90 Index
The TA-90 is a share index of the 90 most highly capitalised companies listed on the Tel Aviv Stock Exchange, which are not included in the TA-35 index. The index began in 1999 with a base level of 100. The index was expanded on 12 February 2017 to include 90 instead of 75 stocks, in an attempt to improve stability and therefore reduce risk for trackers and encourage foreign investment.

Weighting
Since February 2008, the TA-125 is calculated using a free float method, the total market capitalization of the companies weighted by their effect on the index, so the larger stocks would make more of a difference to the index as compared to a smaller market cap company. The basic formula for any index is (be it capitalization weighted or any other stock index). 
 Index level= Σ(Price of stock* Number of shares)*Free float factor/ Index Divisor. 

The Free float Adjustment factor represents the proportion of shares that is floated as a percentage of issued shares. The free-float method, therefore, does not include restricted stocks, such as those held by company insiders.

A company's weight in the index has an upper-limit of 9.8%, the weight of a company that should be higher is limited to 9.8% and the rest is divided between the other constituents of the index. Since October 2007 this restriction has set the effective weight of Teva Pharmaceutical Industries at 9.8%.

To be included in the TA-35 index the company's stock also need to adhere to the following requirement: Meet a public holding threshold of at least 25% and a minimal value of 600 million NIS (to ensure that there is a significant Free float holding, which is not controlled by insiders).

The constituents of the indices are determined twice a year; on the first trading day in January and in July. The largest companies in the TA-125 index are promoted to the TA-35 index if their market capitalisation is 20% more than a current company.

Annual Returns 
The following table shows the annual development of the TA-125 Index since 1993.

Constituents
TA-125 Index Components (as of 23 August 2020):

Former members of the index
Elite – Merged with the Strauss Group.
Agis Industries – Acquired by Perrigo (now known as Perrigo Israel Pharmaceuticals).
 Discount Investment Corporation - Removed from the index due to decrease in free-floating shares.
 MA Industries (Makhteshim Agan) - Acquired by ChemChina in 2011.
Osem - Acquired by Nestlé in 2016.
 Koor Industries - Acquired by ChemChina in 2014.
VeriFone Holdings - Delisted from TASE in 2010, later turned private.
 Avner Oil Exploration - Merged into Delek Drilling.
 Ormat Industries - Merged into Ormat Technologies.
HOT Telecommunication Systems - Acquired by Altice in 2012.
 Clal Industries and Investments - Acquired by Access Industries in 2013.
 Kardan N.V. - Removed from the index due to decrease in capitalization.
Elbit Imaging - Removed from the index due to decrease in capitalization.
 Africa Israel Investments - Acquired by Moti Ben-Moshe in 2018.
 Delek Israel Fuel Corp. - Merged into Delek Group.
Mellanox Technologies - Acquired by NVIDIA in 2019.
Frutarom Industries - Acquired by IFF in 2018.
Given Imaging - Acquired by Covidien in 2014.
 Blue Square-Israel - Acquired by Moti Ben-Moshe in 2016.
 British Israel Investments - Formerly known as Azorim Properties, bought out by Melisron in 2011.
 Nitsba Holdings - Merged into Airport City in 2015.
 NetVision - Merged into Cellcom in 2011.
Ceragon Networks - Delisted from TASE in 2017, traded at NASDAQ.
 Ness Technologies - Split into several companies, later purchased by Hilan, IAI and Formula Systems.
EZchip Semiconductor - Merged into Mellanox in 2016.
 Granite Hacarmel Investments - Acquired by Azrieli Group in 2012.
 012 Smile Communications - Acquired by Partner in 2010.
 Alvarion - Trading suspended in 2014, delisted in 2016.
Ituran Location and Control - Delisted from TASE in 2016, traded at NASDAQ.
Retalix - Acquired by NCR Corp. in 2013.
Jerusalem Economy - Merged with Industrial Building Corporation (also a TA-125 constituent) in November 2019.
Alrov Properties & Lodgings - Removed from the index in August 2019.
 N.R. Spuntech Industries - Removed from the index in August 2019.
 B Communications - Removed from the index in August 2019.
Municipal Bank Ltd - Merged into Mercantile Discount Bank as a private company and delisted from TASE in December 2019.
Redhill Biopharma Ltd. - Delisted from TASE in January 2020, trading at NASDAQ.
Tamar Petroleum Ltd. - Removed from the index.

References

External links
The TA-125 Index at the Tel Aviv Stock Exchange
Reuters page for .TA100
 Bloomberg page for TA-125:IND
Index TA-90 at the Tel Aviv Stock Exchange

Tel Aviv Stock Exchange
Israeli stock market indices